Hong Kong competed at the 1960 Summer Olympics in Rome, Italy. Four competitors, all men, took part in three events in two sports.

Shooting

Three shooters represented Hong Kong in 1960.

Men's 50 m pistol 
 William Gillies

Men's 50 m rifle, prone
 Peter Rull, Sr.
 Henry Souza

Swimming

 Cheung Kin Man (1932 Borneo -?) Men's 100m Freestyle

References

External links
Official Olympic Reports

Nations at the 1960 Summer Olympics
1960 Summer Olympics
1960 in Hong Kong sport